Anthony E. Russo (born 1926) is an American Democratic Party politician who served in the New Jersey State Senate and as the Mayor of Union Township, New Jersey.

Russo was born in Phillipsburg, New Jersey in 1926. He received a BA degree from Lafayette College and an LLB from Rutgers University Law School.

Russo served 27 years on the Union Township Committee, including ten years as the Mayor of Union Township, Union County, New Jersey.  He was elected to the New Jersey State Senate in 1977, when he defeated former Senate President Frank X. McDermott. Russo won by 990 votes, 51%-49%. After completing his term as State Senator he returned to the Union Township Committee where he served an additional ten years, most of which as Mayor of Union.

Russo served many years as the Union County Adjuster.  He also served as the Winfield Park Municipal Attorney and as an Assistant Union County Counsel.  He was inducted into the Hall of Fame of the New Jersey League of Municipalities and also the Hall of Fame of the Union Historical Society.

His wife, Anna, predeceased him in January 2022.

References

1926 births
Living people
Democratic Party New Jersey state senators
Mayors of places in New Jersey
People from Phillipsburg, New Jersey
People from Union Township, Union County, New Jersey
Lafayette College alumni
Rutgers University alumni